Joseph John DeForest (born April 17, 1965) is an American football coach and former player. He is the safeties coach at the North Carolina State University (NC State).  DeForest played college football at the University of Southwestern Louisiana—now known as University of Louisiana at Lafayette.

Early life and playing career
DeForest was born in Teaneck, New Jersey, and grew up in Titusville, Florida.

College
DeForest is a 1987 graduate of University of Southwest Louisiana with a bachelor's degree in marketing. He was a four-year starter and was twice named to the all-Southern and all-Louisiana independent teams.

He also was a two-year letterman as a pitcher on the Ragin' Cajuns baseball squad. He received the inaugural President's Cup, signifying the University's top male athlete.

Professional
In 1987, DeForest was signed as a free agent but then released in the preseason by the Houston Oilers and then signed and quickly released by the New Orleans Saints. He  finished his playing career with a brief appearance during the preseason for the Calgary Stampeders (CFL) before being cut in 1988.

Coaching career
DeForest served as an assistant coach at Duke University from 1994 to 2000, serving as linebackers coach and special teams coordinator. He was hired by Les Miles in 2001 at Oklahoma State University as the special teams coordinator and secondary coach. He remained at Oklahoma State until 2012 and served as the associate head coach, special teams coordinator, and safeties coach. At Oklahoma State, he coached Matt Fodge, a Ray Guy Award winner, and Dan Bailey, a Lou Groza Award winner. In 2012, he was hired by Dana Holgorsen to serve as the defensive coordinator  at West Virginia University. Due to poor performance  WVU fans  jokingly renamed him "eForest," because of the lack of "D" or defense his unit displayed. Following his disastrous stint as defensive coordinator, he was demoted to special teams coordinator following the 2012 season. West Virginia fired DeForest  in 2015; most WVU fans believe WVU never fully recovered from the damage he inflicted.  

On February 26, 2016, DeForest was hired as the special teams coach at the University of Kansas.  In January 2018, DeForest was fired again.  In March 2018, Clay Helton, head football coach at the University of Southern California (USC), hired DeForest as a defensive quality control assistant; in 2019, DeForest coached the safeties for USC. Both Helton and DeForest had previously served as assistant coaches together at Duke. Despite the friendship, USC fired DeForest for poor performance after the 2019 season. North Carolina State hired DeForest in 2020.

References

External links
 NC State profile
 

1965 births
Living people
American football linebackers
American players of Canadian football
Baseball pitchers
Calgary Stampeders players
Duke Blue Devils football coaches
Houston Oilers players
Louisiana Ragin' Cajuns baseball players
Louisiana Ragin' Cajuns football players
Kansas Jayhawks football coaches
National Football League replacement players
NC State Wolfpack football coaches
New Orleans Saints players
Oklahoma State Cowboys football coaches
Rice Owls football coaches
USC Trojans football coaches
West Virginia Mountaineers football coaches
High school football coaches in Florida
Titusville High School alumni
People from Teaneck, New Jersey
People from Titusville, Florida
Coaches of American football from Florida
Players of American football from Florida
Baseball players from Florida